The Mattawamkeag River is a river in Maine.

See also
List of rivers of Maine

References

Maine Streamflow Data from the USGS
Maine Watershed Data From Environmental Protection Agency

Rivers of Aroostook County, Maine
Rivers of Penobscot County, Maine
Tributaries of the Penobscot River